"Džuli" (English version: "Julie") was the  entry in the Eurovision Song Contest 1983, performed in Serbo-Croatian by Montenegrin singer Daniel. It was performed 12th on the night, following the ' Bernadette with "Sing Me a Song" and preceding ' Stavros & Constantina with "I Agapi Akoma Zi". At the close of voting, it received 125 points, and came 4th in a field of 20.

Daniel Popović also recorded song in English (as "Julie") and Hebrew (as "Julia", under the pseudonym Daniel Popenthal).

It was succeeded as Yugoslav representative at the 1984 contest by Vlado & Isolda with "Ciao, amore".

English version 
"Julie", an english version of the song also recorded by Daniel, became a Top 10 hit in 1983 at the European singles charts in Austria, Belgium, Germany, Netherlands, Norway and Switzerland.

Weekly charts
Julie (English version)

Credits and personnel 
 Daniel – music, guitar, vocals 
 Mario Mihaljević – lyrics (original and English)
 Rajko Simunović – lyrics (English)
 Mato Došen – arranger, producer (Jugoton Records)
 Giorgio Osana – producer (Ariola Records)

References 

 

Ariola Records singles
Eurovision songs of 1983
Eurovision songs of Yugoslavia
1982 songs